Glenn Taylor may refer to:
 Glenn Taylor (politician), Alberta Party, Canada
 Glenn Taylor (rugby union) (born 1970), former New Zealand rugby union player
 Glenn Taylor (television presenter), Australian television presenter

See also
 Glen Taylor (born 1941), American businessman and former politician
 Glen H. Taylor (1904–1984), American politician from Idaho